Tan Sri Datuk G. Gnanalingam is a prominent Malaysian businessman.  He is the current executive chairman of Westports Malaysia Sdn Bhd, one of Malaysia's leading port operators.

The Singapore-born captain of industry, who grew up in Port Dickson and Kuala Pilah, is of Sri Lankan Tamil ancestry. He joined the privately held port in 1994 and was instrumental in steering the port into a leading cargo and freight player in Asia.

Ports Involvement
Initiated into the world of transport with his appointment to the Board Member of Port Klang Authority since 1987, Gnanalingam defies conventional wisdom and thoughts.

He founded Kelang Multi Terminal Sdn Bhd (now known as Westports Malaysia Sdn Bhd) in 1994. He became the Executive Chairman in 1996 when Malaysia's first green-field port was privatized. With his sheer hardwork and dedication, he made become Malaysia's largest privately owned port.

He adopted “flexi-port & fast-port” approaches in advocating changes and defying conventional practices to cargo and ship handling, including by implementing integrated port charges,” the citation read.

G Gnanalingam, was also cited for “de-mystifying” general perception of the industry by the public, making ports more public-friendly and creating public-awareness and adopting “garden port concept” making Westport probably the only such port in the world.

He was credited for introducing innovative measures to win traffic during 1997/98 financial crisis that saw Port Klang achieving positive growth as well as fostered feedering to Westport as well as for his commitment to community and welfare causes.

Sports Involvement
An avid sports fan and one-time athlete himself, Gnanalingam is also widely regarded as a marketing guru.

A former marketing director with British American Tobacco, he was the man behind such projects like bringing live telecasts of football's World Cup to Malaysian homes in the 80s.

He was also responsible, during a nine-year period as a consultant for commercial operations for RTM, of increasing its revenue from RM55 million in 1988 to RM350 million in 1996.

It was in 1989 that Tan Sri Gnanalingam made his mark in Malaysian sports when, as marketing consultant, he turned the Kuala Lumpur Sea Games into a money-making event. The Olympic Council of Malaysia Building, built at a cost of RM6 million at that time, stands testimony to the success.

Business, Wealth and Family
Gnanalingam also owns a stake in pencilmaker Pelikan and logistics firm Konsortium Logistiks.

Born in 1945, he is married to Puan Sri Siew Yong Gnanalingam. They have 3 children - Ruben Emir, Shaline and Surin. He is said to be making way for son Ruben to eventually take over the managing of his business enterprise. His two other children will join Ruben later.

Honour

Honour of Malaysia
  : Commander of the Order of Loyalty to the Crown of Malaysia (P.S.M.) (2000)

References

External links
 Transport awards serve as industry benchmarks, portsworld.com
 From Ports to Sports, New Straits Times
 Forbes.com - G. Gnanalingam
 4 Forbes - G. Gnanalingam

Year of birth missing (living people)
Living people
Malaysian businesspeople
Malaysian people of Tamil descent
Malaysian Hindus
Malaysian people of Indian descent
Tamil businesspeople
Commanders of the Order of Loyalty to the Crown of Malaysia